Sidi Aïch is a small town, located at 35° 13′ 47″ N, 9° 07′ 46″ E  in south-central Tunisia, it belongs to Gafsa Governorate and it is located in 29 km in the north of Gafsa.

This city was the birth place of Mohammed Gammoudi, athlete and first Olympic champion from Tunisia.

Ruins near the town have been tentatively identified with Gemellae, a Roman era civitas in the Roman Province of Byzacena.

References

Former populated places in Tunisia
Communes of Tunisia